The Australian Defence Organisation (ADO), also known as simply Defence, is an Australian Government organisation that consists of both the Australian Defence Force (ADF) and the Department of Defence (DoD). The ADO's collective aims are to "defend Australia and its national interests" and "protect and advance Australia's strategic interests".

Diarchy
The Chief of the Defence Force and the Secretary of the Department of Defence jointly manage the ADO under a diarchy and report directly to the Minister for Defence, and on logistical topics, the Parliament of Australia. The ADO diarchy is a governance structure unique in the Australian Public Service.

Australian Defence Force
The armed forces of Australia are the Australian Defence Force, consisting of three branches: the Royal Australian Navy, Australian Army and Royal Australian Air Force. Command of the Australian Defence Force, under the direction of Defence Minister, is the primary responsibility of the Chief of the Defence Force, currently General Angus Campbell.

Reporting to the Chief of Defence Force are the Chief of Navy, Chief of Army, and Chief of Air Force. Each Chief manages the day-to-day executive operations of their branch with both discretionary decision making authority and direction from the Chief of the Defence Force and the various Ministers of the defence portfolio and often cooperate with their counterparts from the other services as well as the Department of Defence.

The Vice Chief of the Defence Force, currently Vice Admiral David Johnston, is responsible for joint force integration, preparedness and military strategy, interoperability, and designing the future force. The Joint Operations Command oversees all joint deployments of the Australian Defence Force and is commanded by the Chief of Joint Operations. The Joint Capabilities Group, commanded by the Chief of Joint Capabilities, provides joint military professional education and training, logistics support, health support and oversees the Joint Logistics Command, Joint Health Command, Australian Defence College, and the Information Warfare Division.

Department of Defence

The Department of Defence is one of the three original Australian Government departments created at Federation of Australia in 1901, alongside the Attorney-General's Department and the Treasury. It is the Australian Public Service entity that provides advice, coordination, and program delivery for defence and military policy.

The Department of Defence also manages and oversees a range of public service and defence force agencies and organisations that deliver and develop the capabilities and services that support the Australian Defence Force. Such agencies include the Army and Air Force Canteen Service, the Defence Community Organisation, and Defence Housing Australia.

The Department also includes key groups including the Capability Acquisition and Sustainment Group, the Defence Science and Technology Group, and the Defence Strategic Policy and Intelligence Group (which oversees the Australian Signals Directorate, Defence Intelligence Organisation, and Australian Geospatial-Intelligence Organisation).

References

Australian Defence Organisation
Australian Defence Force
Department of Defence
Military of Australia
Commonwealth Government agencies of Australia